Hasselbakken is a neighbourhood in the city of Kristiansand in Agder county, Norway. It is located in the borough of Vågsbygd and in the district of Vågsbygd. Hasselbakken is north of Bjørklia, south of Nordtjønnåsen, and west of Åsane.

Transportation 
Bus lines through Hasselbakken:

References

Geography of Kristiansand
Neighbourhoods of Kristiansand